Cinnamomum subavenium is an evergreen tree from South and East Asia that can become  tall.

Leaves of Cinnamomum subavenium are an important spice. It is also a Chinese herb that has been suggested for use as a skin whitening agent. The plant contains substances which inhibit production of tyrosinase an enzyme which catalyzes the production of melanin. The herb has not been established as either effective or safe but is being researched by Hui-Min Wang and his colleagues at Kaohsiung Medical University in Taiwan where experiments shown that it was effective at causing zebrafish to lose their stripes.

References

subavenium
Trees of China
Flora of tropical Asia
Trees of Taiwan